INS Brahmaputra (F31) is the lead ship of her class of guided missile frigates of the Indian Navy. She was built at the Garden Reach Shipbuilders and Engineers (GRSE), Kolkata.

It is fitted with an array of modern sensor suites and matching weapon systems. INS Brahmaputra was commissioned on 14 April 2000 by Captain Pradeep 'Billoo' Chauhan, VSM.

She operates the Westland Sea King helicopter and the MATCH (Multi Role Anti Submarine Torpedo Carrying Helicopter) helicopter, which is an anti-submarine warfare variant of the Chetak helicopter. Brahmaputra is the second ship of the Indian Navy named for the River Brahmaputra. The first vessel of the name was a Type 41  that was commissioned in 1958. The symbol of Brahmaputra is 'The Raging Rhino', for the one-horned rhino native to the Brahmaputra valley.

Operations

Operation Sukoon
In July 2006, Brahmaputra, under the command of Captain Kapil Gupta, was a part of Task Force 54 on its return to India from the Mediterranean, when it was turned back to assist in Operation Sukoon. The task force consisted of three warships and a fleet tanker which were returning from a goodwill visit and were just about to cross the Suez Canal. After the evacuation, the task force remained on station in international waters off Lebanon, monitoring the conflict and ensuring the safety of remaining Indian nationals in Lebanon. The vessels left for their home ports on 10 August 2006. during the 2006 Israeli-Lebanese conflict.

Task Force Europe 2009
During May–July 2009, Brahmaputra was a part of the Indian Navy task force on deployment to Europe. During this deployment, the task force participated in joint-exercises with the Royal Navy and the French Navy. Exercise Konkan-09 with the Royal Navy, was conducted off the coast of the United Kingdom. Exercise Varuna 2009 with the French Navy was off the coast of France.

Gallery

References

 

Brahmaputra-class frigates
Frigates of the Indian Navy
1994 ships
Ships built in India
Ships built in Kolkata